John (Johann von Pfalz-Neumarkt; 1383 – 14 March 1443) was the Count Palatine of Neumarkt from 1410 to his death. The son of Rupert III of the Palatinate, he married Catherine of Pomerania in 1407. He is mainly known for his crushing victory against the Hussites at the Battle of Hiltersried in 1433. 
 Christopher, his son, was king of the Kalmar Union.

References

1383 births
1443 deaths
People from Schwandorf (district)
Counts Palatine of the Holy Roman Empire
House of Palatinate-Neumarkt
People of the Hussite Wars
Sons of kings